Liu Yu-you was a politician in the Republic of China. He served as the Magistrate of Nantou County from 1973 to 1981.

References

1931 births
2002 deaths
Magistrates of Nantou County